Fernand Gambiez (27 February 1903 – 29 March 1989) was a French Army general and military historian who fought in World War II, the First Indochina War and the Algerian War. During the Algerian War, Gambiez was commander-in-chief of the French Army in Algeria.

Gambiez was born in Lille, graduated from Saint Cyr in 1925. He served with the Foreign Legion in Morocco before studying at the Superior War School in 1935. He was a captain in command of a company during the Battle of France. He trained and commanded a Choc battalion in 1943, taking part in the fighting to liberate Corsica in 1944. Gambiez served as chief of staff to the French commander-in-chief Henri Navarre during the First Indochina War, including the Battle of Dien Bien Phu where one of his sons died.

He was promoted to Général de corps d'armée in 1958, commander of the Oran Corps in 1959, Inspector General of the Infantry in 1960 and finally commander-in-chief of the French Army in Algeria in 1961. He was arrested by the rebellious generals during the Algiers putsch in April 1961.

He was the director of the French military history commission from 1969 to 1989. He was also elected member of the Académie des Sciences Morales et Politiques in 1974.

Works 
 L'Épée de Damoclès, la guerre en style indirect (1967). With Colonel Maurice Suire.
 Histoire de la première guerre mondiale (2 volumes, 1968). With Colonel Maurice Suire.
 Libération de la Corse (1973)

References 
 Nicole Pietri et Jacques Valette (eds), Les guerres du général Gambiez, Esprit du Livre, 2009.

External links 
  Review of the book Les guerres du général Gambiez with a short biography. 

1903 births
1989 deaths
People from Lille
French military personnel of World War II
French military personnel of the First Indochina War
French military personnel of the Algerian War
French generals
École Spéciale Militaire de Saint-Cyr alumni
Members of the Académie des sciences morales et politiques
Officers of the French Foreign Legion